Dream Jungle is a novel by Jessica Hagedorn, a Filipino American author.

The book was published in 2003 by Penguin Viking press.

Description 
The book is set in the Philippines in the 1970s. The plot follows Rizalina, a young Filipina girl, and revolves around two events: the purported discovery of a fictionalized stone-age "lost tribe" by a rich, privileged Westerner, and the filming of an extravagant and over-budget Vietnam War film, reminiscent of Apocalypse Now.

References

Novels by Jessica Hagedorn
2003 American novels

Novels set in the Philippines
Novels set in the 1970s